Fontans is a commune in the Lozère department in southern France.

Its inhabitants are called Fontanains.

Personalities 
 Francis Bestion (born 1957), born in Fontans, was vicar general of the Diocese of Mende and has been Bishop of Tulle since December 2013.

See also
Communes of the Lozère department

References

Communes of Lozère